Zygomatic (from Greek  ζύγωμα (zygōma), "yoke") may refer to:
 Zygomatic arch
 Zygomatic bone
 Zygomatic branches of the facial nerve
 Zygomaticus major muscle
 Zygomaticus minor muscle
 Zygomatic nerve
 Zygomatic process
 Zygomatic process of frontal bone
 Zygomatic process of maxilla
 Zygomatic process of temporal bone